Abdul Wahab Khan (–1 September 2013) was a Bangladeshi judge and a Jatiya Sangsad member representing the Manikganj-3 constituency during 1996–2001.

Career
Khan wrote novels with titles like Kolkata Theke Dhaka and Jakhan Ami Munsef Chhilam.

References

1920s births
2013 deaths
Year of birth uncertain
People from Manikganj District
Bangladeshi judges
Bangladesh Nationalist Party politicians
7th Jatiya Sangsad members